Angel Peña Ramírez (born April 13, 1978) is a politician affiliated with the New Progressive Party (PNP). He has been a member of the House of Representatives of Puerto Rico since 2009 representing District 33.

Early years and studies

Angel Peña Ramírez was born April 13, 1978, in Hato Rey, Puerto Rico.

Peña has a Bachelor's degree in Labor Relations from the University of Puerto Rico at Río Piedras, and a Master's degree in the same major from the Interamerican University of Puerto Rico, Metropolitan Campus.

Professional career

Peña worked for the Human Resources Division of Wyndham International at Hotel El Conquistador in Fajardo. In 2005, he worked as Executive Officer I of the Human Resources Office of the Senate of Puerto Rico.

Political career

Peña began his political career as a voting college worker, member of the PNP Youth and Presidential Delegate for the reorganization process of the New Progressive Party.

From 2005 to 2008, Peña served as member of the Municipal Assembly of Las Piedras. He served as Majority Speaker as well as President of the Commissions of Health, among others.

Peña decided to run for the House of Representatives of Puerto Rico at the 2008 general election. After winning a slot in the PNP primaries, he was elected to represent the District 33. During his first term, he served as Vicepresident of the Commissions of East Region Development, and as secretary of the Commissions of Internal Affairs, Health, and Municipal Affairs, among others.

In 2012, Peña was re-elected for a second term.

References

External links
Angel Peña Official biography
Angel Peña Ramírez Profile on WAPA-TV

Living people
1978 births
New Progressive Party members of the House of Representatives of Puerto Rico
People from San Juan, Puerto Rico
University of Puerto Rico alumni